Iwatani, is a Japanese surname. Notable people with the surname include:

, Japanese professional wrestler
, Japanese lyricist, poet and translator
, Japanese video game designer
, Japanese footballer

Japanese-language surnames